The women's doubles competition of the table tennis event at the 2021 Southeast Asian Games was held from 17 to 18 May at the Hải Dương Gymnasium in  Hải Dương, Vietnam.

Participating nations
A total of 24 athletes from seven nations competed in women's doubles table tennis at the 2021 Southeast Asian Games:

Schedule
All times are Vietnam Time (UTC+07:00).

Results

References

External links
 

Women's doubles